lifecell (formerly life:)) is the third largest Ukrainian mobile telephone network operator, (after Kyivstar and Vodafone Ukraine) covering 98.82% of Ukrainian inhabited territory. The company is wholly owned by Turkcell. Lifecell's dialing prefixes are +38063, +38093 and +38073.

As of the end of Q3 of 2014, Ukrainian GSM operator life:) serves 13.6 million subscribers of prepaid, contract and corporate subscription. Company provides roaming opportunities in 184 countries via more than 456 roaming partners. The operator was the first mobile network operator in Ukraine to introduce EDGE technology that offers high speed data transfer. Now the technology is enabled in 100% life:) network.

As of today, six lifecell customer service centers and 193 exclusive shops operate in 103 cities of Ukraine. In addition, life:) subscribers can order life:) services through 153 branded points of sale and 49 487  GSM and non-GSM sales points throughout Ukraine.

History
In January 2005 Astelit launched GSM-1800 service under the life:) brand, and has attracted 7.6 million contract and prepaid subscribers by December 2007. 

In June 2011, it was reported that Russian conglomerate Alfa Group was negotiating a deal to purchase the 45% share in Astelit.

In July 2015, Turkcell completed the acquisition of a 44.96% stake in the company owned by Rinat Akhmetov's SCM Holdings.

In 2017, the company ended its operations in Ukraine's separatist entities Donetsk People's Republic and Luhansk People's Republic.

In 2018, the operator received licenses for 4G LTE in the ranges of 2600 MHz and 1800 MHz. On March 30, 2018, lifecell launched LTE Advanced Pro standard in about 20 cities of Ukraine. First and foremost, Kyiv, Lviv, Kharkiv, Odessa and Dnipro. The company launched its 4G network on 1 July 2018. It is planned that by the end of 2018 the new standard will be available in 1500 cities, covering up to 50% of the total population of Ukraine.

Corporate Social Responsibility
In 2007, lifecell joined the UN Global Compact, as an initiative to encourage CSR (corporate social responsibility) practices by example including the 10 basic principles of human rights, labor standards, environmental protection and anti-corruption measures.

References

External links 
  lifecell Web site

Ukrainian companies established in 2005
Telecommunications companies established in 2005
Mobile phone companies of Ukraine
Ukrainian brands
Companies based in Kyiv